Rebecca Tillett is an American college basketball coach who is currently serving as the head coach of the Saint Louis University women's basketball team. She was previously the coach of the Longwood University women's basketball team. She led both Longwood and Saint Louis to their first appearances in the NCAA Division I women's basketball tournament, in 2022 and 2023 respectively.

Career
Griffin graduated from the College of William & Mary in 1999; she was captain of the women's basketball team during her senior year. She began her career coaching high school basketball in Virginia, spending time at Jamestown High School, Osbourn Park High School, and Forest Park High School. In 2013, she took a position as an assistant coach of the Indiana University of Pennsylvania women's basketball team. After one season at IUP, she became an assistant coach at Navy, where she remained for the next four seasons.

In 2018, Tillett became the head coach of the Longwood women's basketball team, her first collegiate head coaching role. She coached at Longwood for four seasons. In the 2021–22 season, she led the team to a 22–12 record and won the Big South Conference tournament, granting Longwood its first appearance in the NCAA Division I women's basketball tournament. Longwood defeated Mount St. Mary's in the First Four before losing to NC State in the first round of the main tournament.

Tillett was hired by Saint Louis University to coach their women's basketball team in 2022. In the 2022–23 season, her first year as head coach, Saint Louis won the Atlantic 10 Conference basketball tournament, earning the team its first appearance in the NCAA Division I women's basketball tournament. She is the second coach in NCAA history, after Lisa Bluder, to reach the NCAA Division I women's basketball tournament with different schools in consecutive years.

Personal life
Tillett's parents are both teachers and sports coaches. Her father was a high school basketball and soccer coach, while her mother coached middle school soccer. Her brothers Nate and Daniel are both high school coaches as well, coaching boy's soccer and girl's basketball respectively.

Head coaching record

References

Living people
American women's basketball coaches
Basketball coaches from Virginia
Basketball players from Virginia
Longwood Lancers women's basketball coaches
Saint Louis Billikens women's basketball coaches
William & Mary Tribe women's basketball players